The John Popper Project (formal name The John Popper Project Featuring DJ Logic) is an American jam band. The band's style is a combination of rock, hip hop, and improvisational jazz.

The group formed out of a jam session in San Francisco in December 2003 which featured John Popper of Blues Traveler, Rob Wasserman of RatDog, and DJ Logic.

The lineup of the Project is John Popper on harmonica and vocals, DJ Logic on turntables, Tad Kinchla on bass guitar, and Marcus Bleecker on drums.

The group released a self-titled album in October 2006 and performs concerts during breaks in Blues Traveler's touring schedule. The band has performed with guest musicians from jazz and jam bands, including Branford Marsalis, Warren Haynes, and Col. Bruce Hampton.

The John Popper Project Featuring DJ Logic

The John Popper Project released their debut album on October 3, 2006.

Track listing
 "Lapdance"
 "Everything"
 "All Good Children"
 "In The Midst"
 "Fire In Her Kiss"
 "Louisiana Sky"
 "Trigger"
 "Horses"
 "Took"
 "Morning Light"
 "Open Hand"
 "Show Me"
 "Pack Your Love"

Jam bands
Musical groups established in 2003
Musical quartets
Relix Records artists